Cameron Gabriel Echols (born January 22, 1981) is an American retired basketball player. The Chicago, Illinois native has a Dutch citizenship. Standing at 6 ft 8 in (2.03 m), Echols usually played as power forward.

In October 2019 Echols was arrested for domestic battery in Muncie, Indiana.

Professional career
Echols first professional stop was with KR of the Icelandic Úrvalsdeild karla in October 2004. On October 17, he requested to be released from his contract, siding his unhappiness in Reykjavík and homesickness. KR granted his wish but he rescinded on his request shortly after that and continued playing for the club. After a rough start for KR, the team started to play better with Aaron
Harper's arrival in January. Echols play especially improved, and in five games in January he averaged 30.6 points and 15.2 rebounds. He helped KR win 7 of their last 11 games, making the playoffs as the 7th seed. In the playoffs, they fell to Snæfell in the first round, 1–2.

Echols returned to Iceland in 2011 when he signed with Njarðvík. He was named to the 2012 Icelandic All-Star game where he scored 10 points. He helped Njarðvík to the playoffs where they were swept by Grindavík in the first round. For the season he averaged 22.4 points and 11.1 rebound per game.

Awards and honors
All-MAC Honorable Mention: 2004
Icelandic All-Star: 2012

References

External links
Profile at sports.yahoo.com
Profile at eurobasket.com

1981 births
Living people
American expatriate basketball people in Iceland
American expatriate basketball people in Mozambique
American expatriate basketball people in the Netherlands
American expatriate basketball people in Portugal
American expatriate basketball people in Spain
American expatriate basketball people in Switzerland
American expatriate basketball people in Uruguay
American men's basketball players
Ball State Cardinals men's basketball players
Basketball players from Chicago
Cantabria Baloncesto players
Dutch Basketball League players
Feyenoord Basketball players
KR men's basketball players
Njarðvík men's basketball players
Power forwards (basketball)
Tallahassee Eagles men's basketball players
Úrvalsdeild karla (basketball) players